The Bray-Paschal House (also known as the Sheriff Richard Bray Paschal House and Sheriff R. B. Paschal House) is a historic house located at 2488 Wade Paschal Road near Siler City, Chatham County, North Carolina.

Description and history 
The oldest section dates to about 1790, and is a one-story, single-pen log house. Around 1810, a rear shed, engaged front porch and loft were added. In 1860, at the southwest corner, a two-story, vernacular Greek Revival-style frame addition was built. Also on the property is a contributing blacksmith shop, built in 1863, and a stable built in 1860.

It was listed on the National Register of Historic Places December 27, 2011.

References

Houses on the National Register of Historic Places in North Carolina
Houses completed in 1860
Greek Revival houses in North Carolina
Houses in Chatham County, North Carolina
National Register of Historic Places in Chatham County, North Carolina
Blacksmith shops